Harrison Houde (born March 26, 1996) is a Canadian actor, producer, director, YouTuber, and musician. He is best known for his first acting role as Darren Walsh in the 2010 American film Diary of a Wimpy Kid and for his role as 'Bowie' in the sitcom Some Assembly Required. He has also composed original scores, which have aired on TV internationally, and is a synth-wave music producer under the alias Tokyo Rat.

Acting
He landed his first role in Diary of a Wimpy Kid in 2010. 

He was nominated and won a Joey Award for his work in Some Assembly Required on November 16, 2014, in the category "Best Young Actor age 10-19 or younger in a TV Series Comedy/Action Leading Role." In 2015, Harrison was named one of [[The Hollywood Reporter|Hollywood Reporter''']]'s young up-and-coming rising stars to watch from Canada.  The TV Show Finding Stuff Out, which Mr Houde hosted, secured the Canadian Screen Award in 2016 for Best Children's or Youth Non-Fiction Program or Series.

Television
In early 2010, Houde began hosting a television show called Finding Stuff Out, produced by Apartment 11 Productions.

On January 6, 2014, he joined the cast of the Canadian sitcom Some Assembly Required'', which premiered on YTV and is on Netflix worldwide.

Houde's first short film 'I Dare You' made its debut at the 2016 festival de Canne with Telefilm Canada's Not Short on Talent program. 

In 2017, Houde appeared in an episode of Rogue.

In 2018, he appeared on an episode of iZombie, The Hollow, and in the movie Summer of '84.

YouTube
As of November 2022, he has 22.3K subscribers.

In early 2013 he signed with the YouTube network the Collective Digital Studios based in Beverly Hills, California.

In early 2016 Harrison left his YouTube network (Collective Digital Studios now known as Studio71).

Filmography

Films

Televisions

References

External links

Canadian male film actors
Canadian male television actors
Living people
1996 births
Canadian male child actors
Canadian television hosts
21st-century Canadian male singers